Mompha stellella is a species of momphid moth in the family Momphidae.

The MONA or Hodges number for Mompha stellella is 1455.

References

Further reading

 

Momphidae